Kankan (Mandingo: Kánkàn; N’ko: ߞߊ߲ߞߊ߲߫) is the largest city in Guinea in land area, and the third largest in population, with a population of 198,013 people as of 2020.

The city is the capital and largest town of the Kankan Prefecture and of the Kankan Region. The population is largely from the Mande ethnic group.

The Kankan region now has more than 6,167,904 inhabitants (2021). It is the most populous region in Guinea. The region has five (5) prefectures (Kankan, Kérouané, Kouroussa, Mandiana and Siguiri), 53 sub-prefectures, 5  urban communes, 53 rural communes , 878 arrondissements, 68 neighborhoods and 1864 sectors.

Geography 
The city is located on the Milo River, a tributary of the Niger River.

History
Kankan was founded by the Soninke people in the 18th century, after which it became an important trading centre, particularly for kola nuts, and the capital of the Baté Empire.
The population of the city is predominantly from the Mandinka ethnic group and their language is widely spoken throughout the city.

The French explorer René Caillié spent a month in Kankan in 1827 on his journey from Boké, in present-day Guinea, to Djenné and Timbuktu in Mali. He arrived with a caravan transporting kola nuts. He described the visit in his book Travels through Central Africa to Timbuctoo. The town had a population of 6,000 inhabitants and was an important commercial centre with a market held three times a week. Instead of having a surrounding mud wall, the town was defended by quickset hedges. The chief of the town refused Caillié permission to travel along the river to the north as the town of Kankan was fighting for control of the Bouré gold producing area around Siguiri and the Tinkisso River. Instead Caillié left the town heading east in the direction of Minignan in the Ivory Coast.

The town was conquered by Samory Touré in 1881 and occupied by the French in 1891.

In 1904, the city is chosen as the final destination during the construction of the Conakry railway in Kankan.

Climate
Kankan has a tropical savanna climate (Köppen climate classification Aw).

Education 
The Julius Nyerere University of Kankan was founded in 1964.

Places of worship 

Among the places of worship, they are predominantly Muslim mosques.   There are also Christian churches and temples : Roman Catholic Diocese of Kankan (Catholic Church), Église Protestante Évangélique de Guinée (Alliance World Fellowship), Assemblies of God.

Transports 

It is home to the Kankan Airport and a river port. Kankan is the terminus of the lightduty narrow gauge railway from Conakry (traffic suspended since 1993). The N1 highway connects the city with Nzerekore in the south.

References

 
Sub-prefectures of the Kankan Region